The Burigi Game Reserve is found in Tanzania by Lake Burigi.  It was established in 1980. This African game reserve is 2200km².

References

Protected areas of Tanzania
Protected areas established in 1980
1980 establishments in Tanzania
Geography of Kagera Region
Important Bird Areas of Tanzania